Bloody Nasty People: The Rise of Britain's Far Right is a 2012 book about far-right politics in the United Kingdom by British author and journalist Daniel Trilling.

Synopsis
The book charts the rise (and fall) of far-right organisations such as the British National Party and the English Defence League.

Reception
The book was commended by Yasmin Alibhai-Brown in The Independent, who noted that Trilling has 'written an instructive account of white extremism in Britain', while in The Guardian, David Edgar described it as a 'brisk, compelling narrative'. 
Labour MP Jon Cruddas, who defeated a BNP challenge in Dagenham and Rainham in 2010 also reviewed the book for the New Statesman.
Reviews also appeared in Foreign Affairs, New Republic and The Scotsman. Time Out London referred to the work as 'pure pavement-pounding journalism' and Owen Jones praised it as 'authoritative and eloquent'.

References

2012 non-fiction books
Books about fascism
Books about nationalism
Books about politics of the United Kingdom
Books about the far right
British National Party
English-language books
English non-fiction books
Fascism in the United Kingdom
History of the British National Party
Verso Books books